Hangelsberg station is a railway station in the municipality of Hangelsberg, located in the Oder-Spree district in Brandenburg, Germany.

References

Railway stations in Brandenburg
Buildings and structures in Oder-Spree
Railway stations in Germany opened in 1842
1842 establishments in Prussia